Worlds Apart is a novel written by Joe Haldeman and published in 1983.

Plot summary
Worlds Apart is a novel in which two thousand million survivors are prey to a virus that kills everyone over the age of twenty.

Reception
Colin Greenland reviewed Worlds Apart for Imagine magazine, and stated that "It feels perverse to say that a series about the near extinction of the human race seems uneventful, but somehow it does. The futuristic detail is fascinating, but Haldeman relates it in a casual, rambling way that dilutes much of its drama."

Reviews
Review by Dan Chow (1983) in Locus, #272 September 1983
Review by Algis Budrys (1984) in The Magazine of Fantasy & Science Fiction, March 1984
Review by Tom Easton (1984) in Analog Science Fiction/Science Fact, March 1984
Review by Patrick McGuire (1984) in Fantasy Review, May 1984
Review by Frank Catalano (1984) in Amazing Stories, July 1984
Review by C. J. Henderson (1984) in Whispers #21-22, December 1984
Review by Don D'Ammassa (1984) in Science Fiction Chronicle, #63 December 1984
Review by Doug Fratz (1984) in Thrust, #21, Fall 1984/Winter 1985

References

1983 novels